The Departmental Council of Cantal is the deliberative assembly of the French department of Cantal. It consists of 30 members (departmental councilors) and its headquarters are in Aurillac, capital of the department, and the president is Bruno Faure. The general councilors are elected for a 6-years term. The Council includes 8 vice-presidents.

Composition

The president  
The president of the General Council is currently Bruno Faure (LR).

Vice-presidents

Departmental councilors  
The Departmental Council consists of 30 departmental councilors who are elected from the 15 cantons of Cantal. They are elected for a 6-years term.

Visual identity (logo)

References

See also  

 Cantal 
 Departmental councils of France
 Departmental Council of Cantal 

Cantal
Departmental councils (France)